Karara  may refer to:

 Karara, Queensland
 Karara and Lochada Important Bird Area, Western Australia
 Karara, a fictional character from Sgt. Frog.
 Karara, Western Australia

See also
 Amir Karara, Egyptian actor
 Gymnopilus karrara, species of mushroom
 Carrara (disambiguation)
 Carara (disambiguation)